Inveraray ( or ;   meaning "mouth of the Aray") is a town in Argyll and Bute, Scotland. It is on the western shore of Loch Fyne, near its head, and on the A83 road.  It is a former royal burgh, the traditional county town of Argyll, and ancestral seat to the Duke of Argyll.

During the Second World War the Combined Operations Training Centre, located close to the town, was an important military facility.

Coat of arms

The town's coat of arms depicts a net cast out over the ocean, entangled in which are five herrings and the Latin motto "SEMPER TIBI PENDEAT HALEC" (possible English translation: "may a herring always hang to thee").

Arthur Charles Fox-Davies, in his 1909 book A Complete Guide to Heraldry, notes the following:

There is no doubt of its ancient usage. ...and the blazon of the coat, according to the form it is depicted upon the Corporate seal, would be for the field: "The sea proper, therein a net suspended from the dexter chief and the sinister fess points to the base; and entangled in its meshes five herrings," which is about the most remarkable coat of arms I have ever come across.

Inveraray Castle

In 1744 the third Duke of Argyll decided to demolish the existing castle and start from scratch with a new building. The castle was 40 years in construction, and the work was largely supervised by the Adam family, still renowned to this day as gifted architects and designers. The end product was not a castle in the traditional sense, but a classic Georgian mansion house on a grand scale, Inveraray Castle.

Over the years the castle has played host to numerous luminaries; Queen Victoria visited it in 1874, and the Royal connection was further cemented when her daughter, Princess Louise, married the heir to the Campbell chieftainship,  the Marquess of Lorne, in 1871, illustrating the elevated position of the Argyll family in the social order of the times.

Rebuilding the town

In 1747, William Adam had drawn up plans for the creation of a new Inveraray. By 1770, little had been done, and the fifth Duke set about rebuilding the town in its present form. Some of the work on the rebuilt Inveraray was done by John Adam. The Inveraray Inn (formerly known as the New Inn, Great Inn, Argyll Arms Hotel and Argyll Hotel) on Front Street being his, as well as the Town House. Much of the rest of the town, including the church, was designed and built by the celebrated Edinburgh-born architect Robert Mylne (1733-1811) between 1772 and 1800.

The end product was an attractive town which included houses for estate workers, a woollen mill, and a pier to exploit herring fishing, which was to grow in later years to play a major role in the town's economy. The finished product is one of the best examples of an 18th-century new town in Scotland, and the vast majority of the properties in the centre of Inveraray are considered worthy of protection because of the town's architectural significance.

Tourist attractions

In addition to the castle, the Georgian Inveraray Jail in the burgh is now a museum.  Other attractions include the Argyll Folk Museum at Auchindrain.  The Celtic Inveraray Cross can also been seen in the town. The Clyde puffers VIC 72, Vital Spark. The Bell Tower dominates the town, and contains the second-heaviest ring of ten bells in the world. The bell tower is open to the public, and the bells are rung regularly.

In autumn 2014, PBS premiered a series, Great Estates of Scotland.  Inveraray was featured in one episode, as was the present Duke of Argyll, head of the Campbell clan.

Gallery

References

External links

Website for The Inveraray Inn
Website for Inveraray Castle
Website for Inveraray Jail
Inveraray Webcams and Live Weather
Engraving of a view of Inveraray by James Fittler in the digitised copy of Scotia Depicta, or the antiquities, castles, public buildings, noblemen and gentlemen's seats, cities, towns and picturesque scenery of Scotland, 1804 at National Library of Scotland

 
Towns in Argyll and Bute
Highlands and Islands of Scotland
Former county towns in Scotland
Royal burghs